Bromont is a city in southern Quebec, Canada, at the base of Mont Brome; it is in the Brome-Missisquoi Regional County Municipality. The Bromont area and its resort, Ski Bromont, is well known as a tourist destination for its downhill skiing, mountain biking, BMX-riding and water slides. It also features golf and equestrian events in moderate weather. Bromont also boasts a high-tech industrial park, which includes IBM, General Electric, and Teledyne DALSA. Bromont (Roland Désourdy) Airport serves the region. 

In the southern portion of the city lies Lac Bromont, the largest lake within the city limits, and the smaller Lac Gale, near which is built BALNEA Spa, the largest bathhouse resort in Quebec.

Geography 
Located between Montreal and Sherbrooke close to Granby, Bromont's landscape is characterized by a mountain with several summits, called Mont Brome (or Bromont), Mount Gale, and a smaller top, almost a hill, Mount Soleil (literally mount Sun). In contrast, the terrain around this mountainous mass is flat and has hills and vales sparsely distributed. This is crossed by the Yamaska river, flowing in from Fulford from its source Lake Brome, separated from Bromont by Iron Hill and Fulford (both parts of Lac-Brome), and running into Saint-Alphonse-de-Granby. Two lakes, Bromont and Gale, pool between the mountaintops of Mont Brome; Gale Lake, on Mount Gale, is fed by waters of the mountain. The surface of the territory is naturally covered by mixed forest and grasslands, sometimes exploited as grazing grounds or farmland.

Another portion has been developed. Much of Bromont's surface is crisscrossed by roads and trails, including a section of Quebec Autoroute 10 which connects Montreal and Sherbrooke, with access to Bromont at two exits (74 and 78). This network has many touristic crossroads, a historic village, many neighbourhoods with housing and shops, as well as a technology industrial park. Many spaces that are not covered by woodland are cultivated, others are home to large herbivorous domestic animals like cows, horses, and alpacas.

A natural domain established on Mount Gale includes a protected area, uniting privately owned lands for conservation and hiking. In spite of these conservation efforts, a large part of Mount Brome is intensively developed. Bromont, mountain of experiences is a mega-tourist complex, including alpine skiing facilities, a water park, holiday housing, and residences.

Demographics 

Government

Bromont forms part of the federal electoral district of Brome—Missisquoi and has been represented by Pascale St-Onge of the Liberal Party since 2021. Provincially, Bromont is part of the Brome-Missisquoi electoral district and is represented by Isabelle Charest of the Coalition Avenir Québec since 2018.

List of Mayors

History
Bromont was envisioned by Roland Désourdy (1917–2011). In 1963 he became the first French Canadian Master of the Montreal Hunt.

Bromont was developed in 1964, as a model resort community, based in Brome County.

In 1966, Bromont annexed the town of West Shefford, Quebec, which had been founded in 1792 and was a stop on the stagecoach route between Montreal and Sherbrooke, Quebec.

On June 9, 2014, the International Federation for Equestrian Sports (FEI) chose Bromont as the site of the 2018 FEI World Equestrian Games. The main venue for the games was supposed to be the Bromont Olympic Equestrian Park. On July 22, 2016, Bromont was forced to withdraw from hosting the event because of financial problems.

In 2001, the Bromont Velodrome opened - using a wooden track bought from Atlanta following the 1996 Summer Olympics. This wooden outdoor cycling track was used for 20 years before closing in 2020. It was replaced by the Vélodrome Sylvan Adams - a purpose built indoor sports centre built at a cost of $22m, which opened in September 2022.

Hyundai plant
In 1989, Hyundai Auto Canada Inc. opened a stamping and assembly plant in Bromont, employing 800. The  plant was situated on an  site, with body, paint and trim shops, as well as a pumping station for the plant, a paint residue treatment plant, and administrative offices. The plant cost $387.7 million, with Quebec and Canadian federal government subsidies of $131 million.

The plant was designed to manufacture approximately 2,000 Hyundai Sonatas per week. Subsequently, Chrysler and Hyundai considered a joint venture that would have Chrysler rebranding the Sonata manufactured at Bromont, but later said the deal had failed. The Bromont plant was operational for four years before it closed in 1994, with Hyundai's sales unable to support the plant. Hyundai subsequently sold the plant to Olymbec Inc. It  subdivided the plant, leasing the former paint and assembly plant to Goodyear from February 2007. The former metal stamping portion of the plant was leased to AAER Inc., a manufacturer of wind turbines based in Quebec.

Biodiversity 

The environment within Bromont's city limits has allowed special ecosystems to develop; indeed, mountainous terrain, the presence of water in the form of lakes, creeks, and the river, the blend of trees, and the expanse of prairie permit various flora and fauna to flourish there. On Mount Gale, it is possible to observe species of amphibians that only thrive at higher elevations; the lakes harbour many species of fish, amphibians, water birds, turtles, and aquatic mammals such as muskrat.

Humans in the area have kept many species of domestic animals that populate the fields and roam wild just the same; house cats, dogs, and horses are among the most common in the municipality. Fields and forests serve as breeding grounds for many species of birds, some of which remain all year, though a large portion migrates south during the colder months. These include Canada geese, European starling, American crows, and black-capped chickadees. Many animals coveted by hunters and trappers also inhabit the land, like red fox, white-tailed deer, and wild turkey; raccoon and deer are often victims of roadkill.

Covering most of the territory, vegetation of many kinds thrives. A majority of Bromont is covered by forests, though different kinds of vegetation can be found in grasslands and urban developments. Biodiversity is a matter of pride in the region and Bromont aims to respect it.

See also
List of cities in Quebec

References

External links

City of Bromont Site

Cities and towns in Quebec
Incorporated places in Brome-Missisquoi Regional County Municipality